The 2017 British GT Championship was the 25th British GT Championship, a sports car championship promoted by the Stéphane Ratel Organisation (SRO). The season began on 15 April at Oulton Park and finished on 24 September at Donington Park, after ten rounds held over seven meetings.

Calendar
The calendar for the 2017 season was announced on 7 September 2016. The Spa round, originally planned as a 120-minute race, was modified to feature a pair of 60-minute races. All races except Belgian round at Spa, were held in the United Kingdom.

Entry list

GT3

GT4

Footnotes

Race results
Bold indicates overall winner for each car class (GT3 and GT4).

Championship standings
Points system
Points are awarded as follows:

Drivers' championships

GT3

References

External links 
 

British GT Championship seasons
GT Championship